Jérémie Pierre Bréchet (born 14 August 1979) is a French former professional footballer. He was usually used as a left-back but could play as a centre-back. Because of his technical skills he could also play in midfield.

He was capped three times for the French national side.

Club career

Lyon
Born in Lyon, Rhône-Alpes, France, Jérémie Bréchet started his career at local club Olympique Lyonnais. He made his debut in the professional football during the 1998–99 season. In that season he played 15 times. Bréchet played in Lyon until 2003, amassing a total of 116 games for the club and winning the Ligue 1 championship in the 2001–02 and the 2002–03 seasons. In July 2003, Bréchet was transferred to Inter Milan.

Inter Milan
The 2003–04 season started well for Inter, but after six average games, manager Héctor Cúper was fired from Inter and Corrado Verdelli took over. Following the new manager appointment and having sustained an injury, Bréchet was featured for only a few more games. In total, Bréchet played nine games for Inter. Inter informed him that he could leave the club. In 2004, Bréchet signed a contract with Real Sociedad.

Real Sociedad
Bréchet played for Real Sociedad in the La Liga for two seasons. As Bréchet was injured seriously, he managed only 20 appearances for the club.

Sochaux
At the ambitious FC Sochaux, Bréchet made an impressive start on the pitch. After three games, he was appointed captain of the squad. At "Les Lionceaux", he had two strong seasons and became a key player for the team staying injury-free. During his captaincy Sochaux managed to win the Coupe de France twice. In June 2008, Bréchet left the club and moved to PSV.

PSV
In the 2008–09 season, Bréchet signed for Dutch club PSV on a three-year contract.

Return to Sochaux
On 22 June 2009, Bréchet agreed a move back to FC Sochaux, insisting his decision was because of his family. Following the end of the 2011–12 season, Bréchet became a free agent as his contract was not extended.

Troyes
On 9 August 2012, he signed a one-year contract with newly promoted Ligue 1 side Troyes AC.

Bordeaux
In June 2013, Bréchet joined Bordeaux on a one-year deal.

Gazélec Ajaccio
After one year with Bordeaux, Bréchet signed for a Ligue 2 team for the first time in his career, joining Gazélec Ajaccio on a one-year deal.

Honours
Lyon
Division/Ligue 1: 2001–02, 2002–03
Coupe de la Ligue: 2000–01
Trophée des Champions: 2002

Sochaux
Coupe de France: 2006–07

PSV
Johan Cruyff Shield: 2008

France
FIFA Confederations Cup: 2001

References

External links

1979 births
Living people
Footballers from Lyon
Association football defenders
Association football midfielders
French footballers
Olympique Lyonnais players
Inter Milan players
Real Sociedad footballers
FC Sochaux-Montbéliard players
PSV Eindhoven players
ES Troyes AC players
FC Girondins de Bordeaux players
Gazélec Ajaccio players
Ligue 1 players
Ligue 2 players
Serie A players
La Liga players
Eredivisie players
France international footballers
France under-21 international footballers
2001 FIFA Confederations Cup players
FIFA Confederations Cup-winning players
French expatriate footballers
Expatriate footballers in Italy
French expatriate sportspeople in Italy
Expatriate footballers in Spain
French expatriate sportspeople in Spain
Expatriate footballers in the Netherlands
French expatriate sportspeople in the Netherlands